Crandon is an unincorporated community in Spink County, in the U.S. state of South Dakota.

History
Crandon was platted in 1881. The community was named for Frank P. Crandon, a railroad official. A post office was established at Crandon in 1881, and remained in operation until it was discontinued in 1935.

References

Unincorporated communities in Spink County, South Dakota
Unincorporated communities in South Dakota
1881 establishments in Dakota Territory
Populated places established in 1881